Alan Christopher Hunte  (born 11 July 1970) is an English former professional rugby league and rugby union footballer who played between 1989 and 2003. He played rugby league (RL) at representative level for Great Britain, and at club level for Wakefield Trinity (Heritage № 1009), St. Helens, Hull FC, Warrington Wolves and Salford City Reds as a three-quarter, and club level rugby union (RU) for Pontypridd RFC.

Background
Alan Hunte was born in Wakefield, West Riding of Yorkshire, England.

Playing career
Alan Hunte made his début for Wakefield Trinity during January 1989, and he played his last match for Wakefield Trinity during the 1988–89 season	

Hunte was selected to go on the 1992 Great Britain Lions tour of Australia and New Zealand, and would play for the Lions in the 1992 Rugby League World Cup Final at Wembley in October, though unfortunately it was his dropped ball which led to débuting Australian  Steve Renouf scoring the only (and winning) try of the match. He played for St Helens from the interchange bench in their 1996 Challenge Cup Final victory over Bradford Bulls.

Hunte played , i.e. number 2, in St. Helens' 4–5 defeat by Wigan in the 1992 Lancashire County Cup Final during the 1992–93 season at Knowsley Road, St. Helens, on Sunday 18 October 1992.

Hull paid £250,000 for Alan Hunte when he moved from St Helens in 1997 as part of a deal that also included Steve Prescott and Simon Booth, based on increases in average earnings, this would be approximately £430,400 in 2013.

Hunte, together with Anthony Sullivan was the 1997 St Helens season's top try scorer.

His speed was shown in the third test when he ran down Aussie speedster Andrew Ettingshausen over a 70m run after giving him a 10m start.

Hunte later moved to Warrington Wolves and Salford City Reds.

Hunte also switched codes to Rugby Union, joining Pontypridd RFC in 2000 in a blaze of publicity. Hunte's career at Pontypridd was short lived, however, as he struggled to come to grips with the vagaries of the Union code.

Coaching career
Hunte currently works within the coaching setup at Salford Red Devils as Head of Youth Development.

He took over as caretaker head coach in 2013 when Phil Veivers was sacked.

Genealogical information
Alan Hunte is the son of the rugby league footballer who played in the 1960s and 1970s for Wakefield Trinity, Micheal B. Hunte, and Vera Hunte (née Holloway) (birth registered during first ¼  in Pontefract district), whose marriage was registered during first ¼ 1969 in Pontefract district, and he is the older brother of Alison Justine Hunte (birth registered during first ¼  in Wakefield district). Father to Morgan, Eden, and Paige.

References

External links
(archived by web.archive.org) Profile reds.co.uk
Profile at saints.org.uk
(archived by web.archive.org) Profile at ponty.net

1970 births
Living people
Doncaster R.L.F.C. coaches
England national rugby league team players
English rugby league coaches
English rugby league players
Footballers who switched code
Great Britain national rugby league team players
Hull F.C. players
Pontypridd RFC players
Rugby league centres
Rugby league fullbacks
Rugby league players from Wakefield
Rugby league wingers
Rugby union players from Wakefield
Salford Red Devils coaches
Salford Red Devils players
St Helens R.F.C. players
Wakefield Trinity players
Warrington Wolves players